Chennai North is one of the three Lok Sabha constituencies in Chennai, Tamil Nadu. Its Tamil Nadu Parliamentary Constituency number is 2 of 39. Formerly it was known as Madras North.

Assembly segments

After 2009
After delimitation, Chennai North consists of following constituencies

1971 Delimitation (1977-2019)
Chennai North Lok Sabha constituency is composed of the following assembly segments:
1. Royapuram
2. Kolathur
3. T.V.K.Nagar
4. Perambur (SC)
5. Thiruvottiyur
6. Dr. Radhakrishnan Nagar

Members of the Parliament

Election Results

2019

2014

2009

2004

1999

See also
 Chennai
 List of Constituencies of the Lok Sabha

References
 http://164.100.24.209/newls/lokaralpha.aspx?lsno=13

External links
ECI, Chennai North
Chennai North lok sabha  constituency election 2019 date and schedule

Lok Sabha constituencies in Tamil Nadu
Politics of Chennai